Anja Šovagović-Despot (born 25 March 1963) is a Croatian film and stage actress.

Early life and career
Šovagović-Despot was born to the family of Fabijan Šovagović, one of the most respected Croatian actors, and Maja Blaškov. Same as her younger brother, Filip, she pursued the acting career from an early age. After high school she enrolled in the Zagreb Academy of Dramatic Art. There, together with theatre director Krešimir Dolenčić, she founded the "Lift" theatre group in 1981. Two years later she joined Zlatko Vitez and his "Histrion" theatre company. In 1986 she finally settled down in Gavella Drama Theatre.

Personal life 
Šovagović-Despot is married to Croatian actor, Dragan Despot. The couple has two children. She is supporter of the Croatian Democratic Union (HDZ).

Selected filmography 
Stela (1990)
Slow Surrender (2001)
Below the Line (2003)
What Iva Recorded (2005)
Behind the Glass (2008)
Kotlovina (2011)

References

External links
 

1963 births
Living people
Actresses from Zagreb
Croatian actresses
Croatian film actresses
Croatian stage actresses
Golden Arena winners